Rivercene is a historic home located near New Franklin, Howard County, Missouri.  It was built in 1869, and is a two-story, nearly square, Second Empire style orange-colored brick dwelling with two wings.  It features a slate mansard roof and four wood porches.  It was the home of Missouri and Mississippi River steamboat captain Joseph Beeler Kinney.

It was listed on the National Register of Historic Places in 1973.

References

Houses on the National Register of Historic Places in Missouri
Second Empire architecture in Missouri
Houses completed in 1869
Buildings and structures in Howard County, Missouri
National Register of Historic Places in Howard County, Missouri